South Wenatchee is an unincorporated community and census-designated place (CDP) in Chelan County, Washington, United States. It is part of the Wenatchee–East Wenatchee Metropolitan Statistical Area. The population was 1,522 at the 2020 census.

Geography
South Wenatchee is located at  (47.391022, -120.293823). It is bordered to the northwest by the city of Wenatchee and to the northeast by the Columbia River.

Demographics

As of the census of 2000, there were 1,991 people, 620 households, and 450 families residing in the CDP. The population density was 1,097.5 people per square mile (424.7/km2). There were 665 housing units at an average density of 366.6/sq mi (141.9/km2). The racial makeup of the CDP was 67.70% White, 0.25% African American, 1.81% Native American, 0.35% Asian, 0.05% Pacific Islander, 27.47% from other races, and 2.36% from two or more races. Hispanic or Latino of any race were 36.06% of the population.

There were 620 households, out of which 46.6% had children under the age of 18 living with them, 50.6% were married couples living together, 16.0% had a female householder with no husband present, and 27.4% were non-families. 21.3% of all households were made up of individuals, and 7.9% had someone living alone who was 65 years of age or older. The average household size was 3.15 and the average family size was 3.64.

In the CDP, the age distribution of the population shows 33.8% under the age of 18, 12.5% from 18 to 24, 28.2% from 25 to 44, 17.9% from 45 to 64, and 7.7% who were 65 years of age or older. The median age was 28 years. For every 100 females, there were 110.2 males. For every 100 females age 18 and over, there were 110.2 males.

The median income for a household in the CDP was $29,741, and the median income for a family was $31,417. Males had a median income of $27,935 versus $27,786 for females. The per capita income for the CDP was $11,613. About 15.5% of families and 19.9% of the population were below the poverty line, including 23.5% of those under age 18 and 10.6% of those age 65 or over.

References

Census-designated places in Chelan County, Washington
Census-designated places in Washington (state)
Wenatchee–East Wenatchee metropolitan area
Washington (state) populated places on the Columbia River